Synagogue in Nisko (Polish: Synagoga w Nisku) is an inactive Orthodox Jewish synagogue at Polski Czerwony Krzyż Street in Nisko, Poland.

The building was completed in the late 19th century and was devastated during the German occupation in World War II. After 1945, facility was used by PZPS, food wholesaler's, and Polish Wrestling Federation. Day 24 August 1953 synagogue was devolved for Polish consumers' co-operative called Społem and had been used as an inn. At a later stage were situated there shops, coffee house and pizzeria (to date we have).

The building measures at 17 x 10 metres.

External links 
  Synagogue in Nisko in Wirtualny Sztetl

Orthodox synagogues in Poland
Synagogues in Poland destroyed by Nazi Germany